Machismo E.P. is a 5 track EP by British rock band Gomez, released in 2000 on Hut/Virgin Records. Recorded at Real World Studios in Bath, England, Machismo E.P. was originally an individual release, but is often included as a bonus disc with special pressings of the 2000 b-sides compilation Abandoned Shopping Trolley Hotline or the earlier album Liquid Skin.

The track "Machismo" contains a sample from David Blaine's television special Street Magic. This song was included in the soundtrack for 2000 film Gone in 60 Seconds.

Track listing
"Machismo" – 3:36
"Dos and Don'ts" – 2:08
"Touchin' Up" – 4:35
"Waster" – 3:03
"The Dajon Song" – 13:28

Charts

References

External links

Gomez (band) albums
2000 EPs
Hut Records EPs
Virgin Records EPs